Akha or Ikaw may refer to:

Akha, Iran, a village in Mazandaran Province, Iran
Akha, alternate name of Dinan, Mazandaran, a village in Mazandaran Province, Iran
 Akha people
 Akha language
 Akha Bhagat (1615–1674; aka Akha Rahiyadas Soni) a mediaeval Gujarati poet 
 Akha Expedition, an 1883 military expedition in India
 "Ikaw" (song), a 2014 song by Yeng Constantino

See also

 Akka (disambiguation)
 Aka (disambiguation)
 

Language and nationality disambiguation pages